Pipkins is a British children's television programme

Pipkins may also refer to:

People
 Lenzy Pipkins (born 1993), American football player
 Ondre Pipkins (born 1994), American football player
 Trey Pipkins (born 1996), American football player

Other
 The Pipkins, British musical duo

See also
Pipkin (disambiguation)